The 1978–79 Winnipeg Jets season was the franchise's seventh and final season in the World Hockey Association. The WHA folded after the season.

Regular season
Head coach Larry Hillman, who had guided the Jets to the AVCO Cup the previous season, was fired 61 games into the season. Three days later, Tom McVie took over and coached the remaining 19 games and guided the team to a 3rd-place finish in the league, which due to the league's dwindling fortunes meant that the top five teams of the remaining seven in the league (Indianapolis folded midway in the season) went into the playoffs. They finished one point ahead of the rival Whalers for third, which meant that the Jets got a first round bye as New England and Cincinnati played each other. The Jets played the 2nd place team, Quebec. After sweeping the Nordiques, they went to their fifth and final AVCO Cup Finals against the Oilers. Fittingly, the Jets won the Cup 4-2 and clinched the series at Winnipeg Arena 7-3 in Game 6 to end a seven-year run in which they appeared in five AVCO Cups and won three of them (1976, 1978, 1979) before the WHA merged with the NHL with the Jets included.

Final standings

Schedule and results

Playoffs

Winnipeg Jets 4, Quebec Nordiques 0

Winnipeg Jets 4, Edmonton Oilers 2 - Avco Cup Finals

Player statistics

Regular season
Scoring

Goaltending

Playoffs
Scoring

Goaltending

Awards and records

Transactions

Farm teams

See also
1978–79 WHA season

References

External links

Winnipeg Jets (1972–1996) seasons
Winn
Winn